"Amelia Earhart's Last Flight" is a song written by Red River Dave McEnery shortly after Amelia Earhart's disappearance.  It has been believed to be the first song ever performed on commercial television (at the 1939 World's Fair).

It was copyrighted in 1939,  and was first performed by David McEnery on a pioneer television broadcast from the 1939 New York World's Fair.  It was recorded by McEnery in 1941.

It has maintained continued popularity since then, including covers by artists including Kinky Friedman, Ronnie Lane, The Greenbriar Boys, Country Gentlemen, The Phil Keaggy Band, and Plainsong.  Saskatoon-based band The Heartstrings covered the song, and used the second line of the chorus as the title of their 2009 album Far Away in a Land That is Fair.

References

American songs
1939 songs